The Baynunah Formation is a palaeontological formation located in the western region of the Emirate of Abu Dhabi, the United Arab Emirates. It dates to the Upper epoch of the Miocene Period, in the Cenozoic Era.

Geology

Paleoenvironment

Paleofauna

Stegotetrabelodon Footprints

See also 
 
 
 History of the United Arab Emirates
 List of fossil sites

References

Further reading 
  (1993); Wildlife of Gondwana. Reed. 

Geology of the United Arab Emirates
Geologic formations of Asia
Neogene System of Asia
Miocene Series
Western Region, Abu Dhabi